Line M8, officially referred to as the M8 Bostancı-Parseller line, is a rapid transit line of the Istanbul Metro. The line connects Bostancı railway station, on the southern coast of the Anatolian side, to Parseller, in the district of Ümraniye. At Bostancı, connections are available with intercity trains to destinations in Anatolia, as well as the Maramaray service across the Bosphorus.

It opened for service on 6 January 2023.

It is a fully automatic driverless metro line; all stations have platform screen doors and are completely underground.

Stations

References

Istanbul Metro
Transport infrastructure under construction in Turkey
Transport in Kadıköy
Ataşehir
Ümraniye
Railway lines opened in 2023